Elm Grove may refer to:
Elm Grove, Caldwell County, Texas
Elm Grove, Cherokee County, Texas
Elm Grove, Fayette County, Texas
Elm Grove, Harris County, Texas
Elm Grove, San Saba County, Texas
Elm Grove, Wharton County, Texas
Elm Grove, Williamson County, Texas
Elm Grove Camp, Texas, in Guadalupe County